Edward William Nigel Glover (born 20 June 1961) FRS is a British particle physicist. He is a professor of physics at the University of Durham. He graduated from Downing College, Cambridge, with a first in Natural Sciences, and went on to complete a doctorate at Hatfield College, Durham.

Research
Glover conducts research on the phenomenology of particle physics. His calculations based on quantum chromodynamics — the theory of the strong nuclear force — are relevant to measurements made at the Large Hadron Collider.

Awards and honours
Glover was elected a Fellow of the Royal Society (FRS) in 2013. His citation reads:

Personal life
Glover is married to Belgian mathematical physicist Anne Taormina.

References

Academics of Durham University
Alumni of Hatfield College, Durham
Alumni of Downing College, Cambridge
Fellows of the Royal Society
Living people
1961 births
People associated with CERN